Elections were held in Washington on Tuesday, November 2, 2010. Primary elections were held on August 17, 2010.

Federal

United States Senate 

Incumbent Democratic Senator Patty Murray won re-election to her fourth term in office, defeating Republican challenger Dino Rossi by 5 points.

United States House 

All of Washington's nine seats in the United States House of Representatives were up for election. All but one incumbent ran for re-election, with the exception being Brian Baird (D) of the 3rd District, who retired. Baird's seat was won by Jaime Herrera Beutler (R), while incumbents won re-election in all eight other seats.

Statewide

State Supreme Court 
Three positions on the Washington Supreme Court were up for election in 2010. James M. Johnson and Barbara Madsen won re-election uncontested, while Charles K. Wiggins defeated incumbent Richard B. Sanders by less than 1% of the vote.

Ballot measures

Nine statewide ballot measures were certified for the November 2, 2010 statewide ballot.

Legislative

State Senate

Twenty-five of the forty-nine seats in the Washington State Senate were up for election. Despite early leads from several Republican challengers, Democrats ultimately retained control of the Senate, winning fifteen races.

State House of Representatives

All of the seats in the Washington House of Representatives were up for election in 2010. Republicans gained five seats in the election, leading to a spread of 56 Democrats and 42 Republicans in the State House.

References

Official candidate list from the Washington Secretary of State

External links
Elections & Voting at the Washington Secretary of State
Official candidate list
Candidates for Washington State Offices at Project Vote Smart
Washington at Ballotpedia
Washington Election Guide at Congress.org
Washington Polls at Pollster.com

Finance
2010 House and Senate Campaign Finance for Washington at the Federal Election Commission
Washington Congressional Races in 2010 campaign finance data from OpenSecrets
Washington 2010 campaign finance data from Follow the Money
Media
Politics at the Seattle Post-Intelligencer with 2010 Endorsements
Election 2010 at the Seattle Times

 
Washington